Valeria Sergeyevna Starygina (born 13 September 1995) is a Russian ice dancer who competed with partner Ivan Volobuiev.

Career 
Early in her career, Starygina competed with Nikolai Moroshkin.

Starygina teamed up with Volobuiev in 2010. At the Russian Championships, they finished 7th in 2011 and 6th in 2012. Starygina and Volobuiev won gold at the 2011 Coupe de Nice and silver at the 2011 Istanbul Cup.

In the 2012–13 season, they won the silver medal at the 2012 Coupe de Nice.

Programs 
(with Volobuiev)

Competitive highlights

With Volobuiev

With Moroshkin

References

External links 
 

Russian female ice dancers
1995 births
Living people
Sportspeople from Tolyatti